Burst Apart is the fourth studio album by American indie rock group The Antlers. It was released on Frenchkiss Records on May 10, 2011 and the day before in the UK / Japan / Europe by Transgressive Records. It began streaming on the National Public Radio website on April 24, 2011. The cover art was designed by Zan Goodman, who also designed the album cover for their previous album, Hospice.

The track "Parentheses" was released as an iTunes single on April 5, 2011.

Critical reception

Upon its release, Burst Apart received highly positive reviews from most critics. It was featured on many best of the year lists of music magazines and was voted album of the year 2011 by Drowned in Sound. It currently holds a score of 81 from review aggregate website Metacritic, indicating "universal acclaim." Most critics have noted the contrast between Burst Apart and its predecessor Hospice, a highly conceptual album about a hospice worker who falls in love with a dying patient.

Pitchfork endorsed it with its "Best New Music" label; reviewer Ian Cohen remarked that although Burst Apart could not achieve the cult-like following of Hospice, it is "still tethered to a magnanimity and expressive clarity that makes it almost every bit as devastating." Jeremy Aaron of AbsolutePunk said that while the record "marks a move away from the stifling bleakness" of Hospice, it is still "an incredible sounding album," composed with "breathtaking elegance."

Marc Hawthorne of The A.V. Club likewise commented on the difference, writing that Hospice "bummed everyone out--in the best possible way," but that The Antlers were able to create a followup that "easily reaches grand, dramatic heights even while remaining relatively subdued."

Track listing

Personnel
Peter Silberman: Vocals, lyrics, guitar, mandolin, organ
Darby Cicci: Synthesizers, electric pianos, organ, bass, vocals, trumpet, banjo
Michael Lerner: Drums, percussion
Engineered by Darby Cicci
Mixed by The Antlers and Dan Seiders
Mastered by Greg Calbi, Sterling Sound
Cover design by Zan Goodman
Cover photo by Justin Hollar
Additional Design by Zan Goodman, Darby Cicci

References

2011 albums
The Antlers (band) albums
Frenchkiss Records albums
Transgressive Records albums